Office of Legislative Affairs may refer to:

 Office of Legislative Affairs (United States Navy), coordinates relationship between U.S. Congress and U.S. Department of the Navy
 Bureau of Legislative Affairs, coordinates relationship between U.S. Congress and U.S. Department of State
 U.S. Department of Justice Office of Legislative Affairs, coordinates relationship between U.S. Congress and U.S. Department of Justice
 White House Office of Legislative Affairs, coordinates relationship between U.S. Congress and the White House
 New York State Department of Environmental Conservation, Office of Legislative Affairs, coordinates relationship between New York State legislature and New York State Department of Environmental Conservation
 Legislative Affairs Office, in China, office in the State Council assists the Premier in providing legal advice and administrative laws to govern the behavior of government departments